Vitamin B is a water-soluble vitamin with a key role in the normal functioning of the brain and nervous system, and for the formation of blood.

B12 or B-12 may also refer to:

Music 
 B12 (band), a British electronic music duo
 "B12", a song by Grey Daze led by Chester Bennington

Transportation 
 B12 (New York City bus), a bus line serving Brooklyn
 Bensen B-12, a 1961 American unconventional aircraft
 Chery B12, a 2007 Chinese Chery automobile model
 LNER Class B12, a class of steam locomotives
 Mallee Highway or B12
 Martin B-12, a modified version of the Martin B-10 bomber
 Nissan Sunny B12, a car model
 Queensland B12 class locomotive, a class of steam railway locomotive
 Alpina B12, a car model by Alpina

Other uses 
 Brandon C. Rodegeb or B-12 (born 1977), American music executive, film-maker, rap artist, and writer
 Caro–Kann Defence's ECO code in chess
 B12, a student model clarinet manufactured by Buffet Crampon
 Boron-12 (B-12 or 12B), an isotope of boron
 Big 12 Conference

See also
 HLA-B12, an HLA-B serotype
 IgG1-b12, an antibody against the HIV surface protein gp120 found in some long-term nonprogressors
 12B (disambiguation)